Linguistic film theory is a form of film theory that studies the aesthetics of films by investigating the concepts and practices that comprise the experience and interpretation of movies.

Overview
Linguistic film theory was proposed by Stanley Cavell and it is based on the philosophical tradition begun by late Ludwig Wittgenstein. The theory itself is said to mirror aspects of the activity of Wittgenstein's own philosophising (e.g. Wittgenstein's thought experiments) as films are viewed capable of engaging the audience in a therapeutic process of 'dialogue' and even investigate the absurd and the limits of thought. Cavell's framework is seen as a distinctive way of approaching film and philosophy since question of style - the finding of words adequate to our aesthetic experience - is central to the understanding of the meaning of films. One of his ideas involved the position that "if one thinks of a grammar as a machine for generating sentences, then perhaps one will wish to speak of the camera and its film as a machine for generating idioms."

Critics from this tradition often clarify misconceptions used in theoretical film studies and instead produce analysis of a film's vocabulary and its link to a form of life.

See also
 Film-Philosophy
 Historical poetics
 Neoformalism in film theory

References

Bibliography
 Richard Allen, "Cognitive Film Theory," in Wittgenstein, Theory and the Arts, Routledge, 2001,  
 Stanley Cavell, The World Viewed: Reflections on the Ontology of Film (1971); 2nd enlarged edition. (1979)  
 Stephen Mulhall, On Film, London/New York: Routledge, 2002.  
 Rupert Read and Jerry Goodenough (eds.), Film as Philosophy: Essays on Cinema After Wittgenstein and Cavell, Palgrave Macmillan, 2005.

External links
 Daniel Barnett, "If a Film Did Philosophy We Wouldn′t Understand It" Review of Read-Goodenough collection of essays.
 Stanley Cavell, Conversations with History: Stanley Cavell. YouTube video of Cavell discussing his philosophy of film.
 Rupert Read, "What theory of film do Wittgenstein and Cavell have? (Introduction II)",  Introduction to Film as Philosophy: Essays on Cinema After Wittgenstein and Cavell, Palgrave Macmillan, 2005.

Film theory